Khreshchatyi Park is a city park in Kyiv located next to the European Square, on right bank slopes of Dnipro and along the Volodymyr Descent.

Since 2019, a glass pedestrian bridge has connected the park with Volodymyr Hill.

Visitor's attractions and landmarks
 National Philharmonic of Ukraine
 National Parliamentary Library of Ukraine
 People's Friendship Arch
 Monument to the Magdeburg Rights
 Monument to Mikhail Glinka
 Kyiv Water Museum (Water information center)
 Kyiv State Puppets Theater (previously the Dnipro Stereo-Cinema Theater)

Former landmarks
 Monument to Alexander II of Russia (replaced with Joseph Stalin)
 Monument to Grigory Petrovsky

Gallery

References

External links

 Khreshchatyi Park at the Kyiv e-Encyclopedia.
 Khreshchatyi Park at Kievtown.net

Tourist attractions in Kyiv
Parks in Kyiv